Prime Airlines was formed by HeavyLift Cargo Airlines (HC Airlines) as a passenger charter carrier. Initially offering its sole aircraft on an ad hoc basis from its base at East Midlands Airport (EMA) near Nottingham.

History
Originally the airline was to be called Breeze but the company had difficulties in securing the name for operation. Finally the name Prime Airlines was chosen. With the assistance of former Transaer managers HC Airlines leased its sole aircraft an A300B4-203 and recruitment began for cabin crew. As the airline only had one aircraft a total of 27 cabin crew were hired for the start of operations in mid-2001. The company had no need to recruit flight crew as HC Airlines operated the Airbus A300B4 in cargo configuration and simply cross utilized the crew. Once the airline obtained its AOC it began operations for a number of British inclusive tour operators and the military flying to destinations around Europe and the Middle East. After 9/11 the company suffered with lack of contracts and a second blow came when an American Airlines Airbus A300 (Flight 587) crashed in New York City. Like most airlines at this time Prime had to make redundancies and cut its cabin crew numbers in half. The start of 2002 looked better for Prime Airlines as once again ad hoc charter contacts came in. The company started to plan for a brighter future and looked at adding extra aircraft to its fleet.

The closure
One year after the events of 9/11, Prime Airlines and its parent company HC Airlines closed down. This came as Heavylift's financial problems worsened closing down its engineering, cargo and passenger services.

Fleet
Prime Airlines leased a former Transaer aircraft registered EI-TLQ. The aircraft was painted in a basic white livery with Prime titles on the main fuselage and Logo on the tail. Once the aircraft arrived it was registered G-HLAD. The aircraft was fitted with 314 seats in all economy, however the seats in the forward section could be changed to business class seats.

Originally the aircraft went into service in 1981 with Laker Airways then went on to Air Jamaica before being placed into service with Transaer.

The aircraft was scrapped in 2005 at Pinal Airpark, Arizona.

See also
 List of defunct airlines of the United Kingdom

External links

Defunct airlines of the United Kingdom
Airlines established in 2001
Airlines disestablished in 2002